County Donegal was a UK Parliament constituency in Ireland, returning two Members of Parliament (MPs).

Boundaries
This constituency comprised the whole of County Donegal. In 1885, it was divided into separate constituencies of East Donegal, North Donegal, South Donegal and West Donegal.

Members of Parliament
Constituency created (1801)

Constituency abolished (1885)

Elections

Elections of the 1880s

Elections of the 1870s

 Caused by Wilson's death.

 Caused by Conolly's death.

Elections of the 1860s

 Caused by Hayes' death.

Elections of the 1850s

Elections in the 1840s

 Caused by Conolly's death

Elections of the 1830s

Elections of the 1810s

Elections of the 1800s

References

The Parliaments of England by Henry Stooks Smith (1st edition published in three volumes 1844–50), 2nd edition edited (in one volume) by F.W.S. Craig (Political Reference Publications 1973)

Westminster constituencies in County Donegal (historic)
Constituencies of the Parliament of the United Kingdom established in 1801
Constituencies of the Parliament of the United Kingdom disestablished in 1885